Different Drummers  is a 2013 American coming-of-age and drama film. It tells the story about the bond of two American elementary school boys in North Spokane, Washington, USA during the 1960s with different disorders they are struggling with, one with attention deficit disorder and the other with progressively-worsening muscular dystrophy. One of the boys' evolving concept and relationship with God is a central theme for the film. It stars Brayden Tucker, and Ethan Reed as the main characters. It was filmed in late 2012 in Spokane, Washington.

References

External links 

 
 

2013 films
2013 drama films
American coming-of-age films
Drama films based on actual events
Films set in the 1960s
Films shot in Washington (state)
Muscular dystrophy
Publications about attention deficit hyperactivity disorder
2010s English-language films
2010s American films